Ettore Sacchi (31 May 1851 – 6 April 1924) was an Italian lawyer and politician. He was one of the founders and main leaders of the Italian Radical Party.

Biography
Ettore Sacchi was born in Cremona in the Kingdom of Lombardy–Venetia on 31 May 1851. He graduated in law at the University of Pavia. During these years he became a member of the Historical Far Left, the far-left movement active in Italy in the second party of the 19th century.

After the 1882 general election Sacchi became a member of the Italian Chamber of Deputies. In 1898 after the death of the left-wing leader Felice Cavallotti, Sacchi became the new head of The Extreme and started a process of modernization that ended in 1904, when he officially founded the Italian Radical Party.

Sacchi abandoned increasingly left-wing ideologies, switching the PR into a more moderate party. Moreover, after the assassination of King Umberto I, Sacchi exalted him and for this was accused of monarchism, by the socialists.

In 1906 he became Minister of Grace and Justice under the premiership of Sidney Sonnino and in 1910 he was appointed by Luigi Luzzatti, Minister of Public Works.

In 1910s Sacchi implemented a politician alliance with the dominant leader of that decade, Giovanni Giolitti, who led the centrist Liberal Union.

When World War I broke out, Sacchi was one of the main supporters of neutralism. In 1916 Sacchi was appointed again Minister of Justice, in the cabinets of the liberals Paolo Boselli and Vittorio Emanuele Orlando.

In 1919 Sacchi resigned and removed the support to Orlando's government, but in the general election of the same year the Radicals lost many votes and in the 1921 election, Sacchi did not succeed in being re-elected in the Italian Parliament.

Sacchi died in Rome on 6 April 1924, in poverty.

References

External links

1851 births
1924 deaths
Politicians from Cremona
Historical Far Left politicians
Italian Radical Party politicians
Italian Ministers of Public Works
Deputies of Legislature XV of the Kingdom of Italy
Deputies of Legislature XVI of the Kingdom of Italy
Deputies of Legislature XVIII of the Kingdom of Italy
Deputies of Legislature XIX of the Kingdom of Italy
Deputies of Legislature XX of the Kingdom of Italy
Deputies of Legislature XXI of the Kingdom of Italy
Deputies of Legislature XXII of the Kingdom of Italy
Deputies of Legislature XXIII of the Kingdom of Italy
Deputies of Legislature XXIV of the Kingdom of Italy
Deputies of Legislature XXV of the Kingdom of Italy
Italian Ministers of Justice
19th-century Italian lawyers
Italian political party founders